is a Japanese actor.

Career
Oshinari co-starred in Shunji Iwai's All About Lily Chou-Chou with Hayato Ichihara. He also appeared in films such as Kenta Fukasaku's Battle Royale II: Requiem and Takahisa Zeze's Heaven's Story.

Filmography

Film
 Blue Spring (2001)
 All About Lily Chou-Chou (2001)
 Tomie: Re-birth (2001)
 Battle Royale II: Requiem (2003)
 The Cat Leaves Home (2004)
 Animus Anima (2005)
 Year One in the North (2005)
 Lorelei: The Witch of the Pacific Ocean (2005)
 School Daze (2005)
 Taki 183 (2006)
 Akihabara@Deep (2006)
 Baby,Baby,Baby! (2009)
 Heaven's Story (2010)
 The Lightning Tree (2010)
 The Egoists (2011)
 A Pale Woman (2013)
 Crying 100 Times: Every Raindrop Falls (2013)
 Kamen Rider Wizard in Magic Land (2013)
 Kabukicho Love Hotel (2014)
 Dark Side of the Light (2016)
 Impossibility Defense (2018)
 My Friend "A" (2018)
 We Are Little Zombies (2019) 
 Mio on the Shore (2019)
 Stare (2020)
 Around the Table (2021)
 Scroll (2023)
 Shylock's Children (2023)

Television
 Boys Over Flowers (2005) - Nakatsuka
 Maō (2008) - Soda Mitsuru
 Hanayome to Papa (2008) - Kanda Ryuta
 Orthros no Inu (2009)
 Kagi no Kakatta Heya  (2012) - Nakano Shuya
 Taburakashi: Daikō Joyūgyō Maki (2012)
 Rekishi Hiwa Historia (2013) - Saitō Hajime
 Gunshi Kanbei  (2014) - Konishi Yukinaga
 Death Note (2015) - Mikami Teru
 Segodon  (2018) - Inoue Kaoru
 Piple (2020) - Yasunari Shukugawa
 Reach Beyond the Blue Sky (2021) - Iwasaki Yanosuke
 Kamen Rider Geats (2022) - Giroli

References

External links
 
 

1981 births
Actors from Chiba Prefecture
Japanese male film actors
Japanese male television actors
Living people
People from Chiba (city)
20th-century Japanese male actors
21st-century Japanese male actors